891 Gunhild (prov. designation:  or ) is a large background asteroid from the outer regions of the asteroid belt, that measures approximately  in diameter. It was discovered on 17 May 1918, by astronomer Max Wolf at the Heidelberg-Königstuhl State Observatory in southwest Germany. The dark D-type asteroid has a rotation period of 11.9 hours. Any reference of the asteroid's name to a person is unknown.

Orbit and classification 

Gunhild is a non-family asteroid of the main belt's background population when applying the hierarchical clustering method to its proper orbital elements. It orbits the Sun in the outer asteroid belt at a distance of 2.8–2.9 AU once every 4 years and 10 months (1,769 days; semi-major axis of 2.86 AU). Its orbit has an eccentricity of 0.03 and an inclination of 14° with respect to the ecliptic. The body's observation arc begins at Heidelberg Observatory on 18 May 1918, the night after its official discovery observation.

Naming 

This minor planet is named after a Feminine German first name. Any reference of this name to a person or occurrence is unknown.

Unknown meaning 

Among the many thousands of named minor planets, Gunhild is one of 120 asteroids, for which no official naming citation has been published.

Physical characteristics 

In both the Tholen- and SMASS-like taxonomy of the Small Solar System Objects Spectroscopic Survey (S3OS2), as well as in the SDSS-based taxonomy, Gunhild is a dark D-type asteroid. This asteroid spectral type is common among outer belt asteroids and very common among the Jupiter trojan population.

Rotation period 

In July 2015, a rotational lightcurve of Gunhild was obtained from photometric observations by the Spanish group of asteroid observers, OBAS. Lightcurve analysis gave a rotation period of  hours with a brightness amplitude of  magnitude.

Diameter and albedo 

The Collaborative Asteroid Lightcurve Link derives an albedo of 0.0656 and a diameter of 51.89 kilometers based on an absolute magnitude of 10.0. Several asteroid occultation observed between 2010 and 2014 gave a best-fit ellipse dimension of 52.0 × 52.0 kilometers (one observation) and 63.0 × 63.0 kilometers (three observations). These timed observations are taken when the asteroid passes in front of a distant star.

References

External links 
 Lightcurve Database Query (LCDB), at www.minorplanet.info
 Dictionary of Minor Planet Names, Google books
 Asteroids and comets rotation curves, CdR – Geneva Observatory, Raoul Behrend
 Discovery Circumstances: Numbered Minor Planets (1)-(5000) – Minor Planet Center
 
 

000891
Discoveries by Max Wolf
Named minor planets
19180517